Landis+Gyr is a publicly listed, multinational corporation operating in over 30 countries and headquartered in Cham, Switzerland. Landis+Gyr makes meters and related software for electricity and gas utilities.

History
Landis+Gyr was founded in 1896 as Theiler & Co. in Zug, in the canton of Zug, Switzerland, by technician Richard Theiler and entrepreneur Adelrich Gyr. It began by manufacturing electricity meters that were developed by Theiler. Heinrich Landis joined the business in 1903, acquired it in 1904 and introduced Karl Heinrich Gyr as a partner in 1905, renaming it Landis & Gyr. The company benefited from the rise of the electronics industry and expanded abroad over the following years. By 1914, when it was made a joint-stock company, it was the largest employer in the canton of Zug, with over 800 employees. 

In the 1920s, Landis & Gyr opened offices in New York City and Australia and took over competitors to form a global technology group. From the 1930s, the company diversified with telemetry and remote control products. After leadership struggles in the 1950s, a new management reorganized the financing and accounting and converted Landis & Gyr into a holding company.  The range was expanded to include service machines, air conditioning and ventilation products. Landis & Gyr increased its personnel, with 14,000 employees around 1970 (5,200 of them in Zug). 

From the mid-1970s and especially after 1984, the group was frequently restructured. In 1987, Landis & Gyr was acquired by Stephan Schmidheiny, who sold it to Elektrowatt in 1995.  It is today a part of Siemens Building Technologies. The company was also known for producing optical phone cards until 2006. Landys+Gyr phone cards were used in many countries such as Israel, Belgium, Switzerland and more.

Ownership and acquisitions
 1976 – Landis+Gyr acquired Duncan Electric Company of Lafayette, Indiana.
 1987 – Landis+Gyr acquired MCC Powers of Chicago. MCC Powers had by then been a long established entity in the US building management market. Spurred by the liberalization and deregulation of global markets, Landis+Gyr re-oriented its business, adding electronic products.
 Late 1990s – In the late 1990s, Landis+Gyr went through a series of different investors and owners, amongst them Elektrowatt, KKR and Siemens.
 2004 – Landis+Gyr was acquired by then Australia-based Bayard Capital for an undisclosed amount. Bayard Capital had already acquired the British metering company Ampy Automation-Digilog. As Bayard Capital continued to add other acquisitions to the group, 2008 saw the Landis+Gyr name being extended to the whole group in May 2008. An organizational realignment took place under Bayard Capital's ownership. The company moved to a regional structure, assigning regional corporate structures for North America; South America; UK/Pre-Payment; Europe; and Asia Pacific.
 2006 – Landis+Gyr acquired Finnish Enermet Group, and also Hunt Technologies and Cellnet Technologies, both of which are from the United States.
 2011 – Landis+Gyr was acquired by Toshiba Corporation of Japan for US$2.3 billion.
 2017 – On July 21, 2017, Landis+Gyr listed its shares (ticker symbol: LAND) on the SIX Swiss Exchange.

Utilities
Various utilities have worked with Landis+Gyr in meeting their consumers' demand for energy management tools by rolling out smart meters. Below are some of the utilities that have worked with Landis+Gyr in deploying smart metering technology to energy consumers.

 Europe, Middle East & Africa: British Gas; Iberdrola; Électricité Réseau Distribution France (ERDF); E.ON; Järvi-Suomen Energia Oy; Vattenfall; Eskom; RWE.
 Asia Pacific: Energex; Ergon Energy; Ausgrid; Essential Energy; Western Power; ESTA; Genesis Energy Limited; Meralco; China Light & Power; Singapore Power.
 North America: Oncor Energy; Pacific Gas and Electric; Hydro-Québec; AEP Texas.
 South America: Copel; AES Eletropaulo; Ampla – Enel/ENDESA Group; Light; CEMIG; National Electricity Administration, Paraguay (ANDE); Cooperativa Regional de Electricidad, Bolivia (CRE); EDESUR - Enel/ENDESA Group (Argentina); CODENSA – Enel/ENDESA Group (Colombia).

Criticism
 In 2016, Phil Mocek of MuckRock started investigating a project in which Landis+Gyr was involved. After Mocek received the requested information, Landis+Gyr followed up by filing a lawsuit demanding the documentation not be made public.

References

Swiss companies established in 1896
Manufacturing companies established in 1896
Electronics companies established in 1896
Manufacturing companies of Switzerland
Electronics companies of Switzerland
Canton of Zug
Toshiba
Meter manufacturers
1976 mergers and acquisitions
1987 mergers and acquisitions
2004 mergers and acquisitions
2006 mergers and acquisitions
2011 mergers and acquisitions
2017 initial public offerings
Companies listed on the SIX Swiss Exchange